Mpoti  is a village in the Sotouboua prefecture in the Centrale Region of Togo.

References

Populated places in Centrale Region, Togo